John Beadle Price (September 13, 1883 – May 11, 1952) was an American football and baseball coach and physician. He served as the head football coach at Slippery Rock State Normal School —now known as Slippery Rock University of Pennsylvania—from 1906 to 1907, Ursinus College in Collegeville, Pennsylvania from 1908 to 1913, Trinity College in Hartford, Connecticut from 1914 to 1915, Muhlenberg College in Allentown, Pennsylvania rom 1916 to 1917, and Franklin & Marshall College in Lancaster, Pennsylvania from 1920 to 1923, compiling a career college football coaching record of 69–40–15.

Early life, playing career, education, and military service
A native of St. Clair, Pennsylvania, Price attended Ursinus College in Collegeville, Pennsylvania, where he captained the football and baseball teams before graduating in 1905. Price earned a medical degree from the Medico-Chirurgical College of Philadelphia in 1914 and did postgraduate work at Harvard Medical School and the New York Eye and Ear Infirmary. During World War I, he served a captain in the Medical Corps of the United States Army with the rank of captain.

Coaching career

Muhlenberg
Price was the football and baseball coach at Muhlenberg College in Allentown, Pennsylvania.  He coached the football team for the 1916 and 1917 seasons, amassing a record of 9–4–3.

Franklin & Marshall
Price served as the head football coach at Franklin & Marshall College in Lancaster, Pennsylvania for four seasons, from 1920 to 1923, compiling a record of 20–10–5.  While at Franklin & Marshall, Price coached future head coach Jonathan K. Miller.

Medical career and death
Price practiced medicine for 35 years as an ear, nose, and throat specialist. He was on staff at Graduate Hospital in Philadelphia and Montgomery Hospital in Norristown, Pennsylvania. He died on May 11, 1952, at his home in Norristown, following a week-long illness.

Head coaching record

References

External links
 

1883 births
1952 deaths
20th-century American physicians
American otolaryngologists
Franklin & Marshall Diplomats baseball coaches
Franklin & Marshall Diplomats football coaches
Muhlenberg Mules baseball coaches
Muhlenberg Mules football coaches
Slippery Rock football coaches
Trinity Bantams baseball coaches
Trinity Bantams football coaches
Ursinus Bears baseball coaches
Ursinus Bears baseball players
Ursinus Bears football coaches
Ursinus Bears football players
Perelman School of Medicine at the University of Pennsylvania alumni
United States Army officers
United States Army personnel of World War I
Physicians from Pennsylvania
People from St. Clair, Pennsylvania
Coaches of American football from Pennsylvania
Players of American football from Pennsylvania
Baseball coaches from Pennsylvania
Baseball players from Pennsylvania
Military personnel from Pennsylvania